Joe Grant (born 17 December 1967 in White House, Jamaica) is Jamaican born cricketer who played briefly for Essex till 2004.

References

External links

1967 births
Living people
Jamaican expatriate sportspeople in England
Jamaican cricketers
Essex cricketers
Cambridgeshire cricketers
Jamaica cricketers
People from Westmoreland Parish